The 2018 Southeastern Conference football season represents the 86th season of SEC football taking place during the 2018 NCAA Division I FBS football season. The season began on August 30 and will end with the SEC Championship Game, between Alabama and Georgia, on December 1. The SEC is a Power Five conference under the College Football Playoff format along with the Atlantic Coast Conference, the Big 12 Conference, the Big Ten Conference, and the Pac-12 Conference. For the 2018 season, the SEC has 14 teams divided into two divisions of seven each, named East and West.

Background

Previous season
Georgia defeated Auburn 28–7 in a rematch from Week Ten in 2017 season (loss to Auburn by 40–17) for the 2017 SEC Championship Game.

Ten SEC teams participated in bowl games. Mississippi State defeated Louisville 31–27 in the TaxSlayer Bowl. South Carolina defeated Michigan 26–19 in the Outback Bowl. Missouri lost to Texas 16–33 in the Texas Bowl. Texas A&M lost to Wake Forest 52–55 in the Belk Bowl. Kentucky lost to Northwestern 23–24 in the Music City Bowl. LSU lost to Notre Dame 17–21 in the Citrus Bowl. Auburn lost to UCF 27–34 in the Peach Bowl.

Georgia defeated Oklahoma 54–48 at second overtime in the Rose Bowl semifinal game and Alabama defeated Clemson 24–6 in the Sugar Bowl semifinal game.

Alabama defeated Georgia 26–23 at overtime in the CFP National Championship game.

Preseason

Recruiting classes

SEC media days
The SEC conducted its annual media days at the Hyatt Regency Birmingham – The Wynfrey Hotel in Hoover, Alabama on July 16–19. The event commenced with a speech by commissioner Greg Sankey, and all 14 teams sent their head coaches and three selected players to speak with members of the media. The event along with all speakers and interviews were broadcast live on the SEC Network and streamed live on ESPN.com.

Preseason media polls
The SEC Media Days concluded with its annual preseason media polls. Since 1992, the credentialed media has gotten the preseason champion correct just six times. Only nine times has the preseason pick even made it to the SEC title game. Below are the results of the media poll with total points received next to each school and first-place votes in parentheses.

SEC Champion Voting
 Alabama (193)
 Georgia (69)
 Auburn (14)
 South Carolina (4)
 Florida (2)
 Mississippi State (1)
 Missouri (1)

West Division
 1. Alabama (263) – 1971
 2. Auburn (19) – 1664
 3. Mississippi State (2) – 1239
 4. Texas A&M – 1091
 5. LSU – 1025
 6. Ole Miss – 578
 7. Arkansas – 412

East Division 
 1. Georgia (271) – 1977
 2. South Carolina (8) – 1535
 3. Florida (4) – 1441 
 4. Missouri – 1057
 5. Kentucky (1) – 874 
 6. Tennessee (1) – 704
 7. Vanderbilt – 392 

First place votes in 
References:

Preseason All-SEC Media

References:

Head coaches

Rankings

Schedule

Regular season

All times Eastern time.  SEC teams in bold.

Rankings reflect those of the AP poll for that week until week ten when CFP rankings are used.

Week One

Week Two

Week Three

Week Four

Week Five

Week Six

Week Seven

Week Eight

Week Nine

Week Ten

Week Eleven

Week Twelve

Week Thirteen

Week Fourteen

Championship game
 

The game between South Carolina and Marshall, originally scheduled for September 15, 2018, was canceled in anticipation of Hurricane Florence. The Gamecocks scheduled Akron to replace Marshall, as Akron had their game against Nebraska canceled due to inclement weather earlier in the year.

SEC vs other conferences

SEC vs. Power 5 matchups
This is a list of teams considered by the SEC as "Power Five" teams for purposes of meeting league requirements that each member play at least one "power" team in non-conference play. In addition to the SEC, the NCAA officially considers all football members of the ACC, Big 10, Big 12 and Pac-12, plus independent Notre Dame (a full but non-football ACC member), as "Power Five" teams.

All rankings are from the current AP Poll at the time of the game.

SEC records vs other conferences
2018-19 records against non-conference foes:

Regular Season

Post Season

Postseason

Bowl games

(Rankings from final CFP Poll; All times Eastern)

Awards and honors

Player of the week honors

SEC Individual Awards
The following individuals won the conference's annual player and coach awards:

Offensive Player of the Year: Tua Tagovailoa, QB, Alabama
Defensive Player of the Year: Josh Allen, LB, Kentucky 
Coach of the Year: Mark Stoops, Kentucky 
Special Teams Player of the Year: Braden Mann, P/K, Texas A&M
Freshman Player of the Year: Jaylen Waddle, WR, Alabama
Newcomer Player of the Year: Ke'Shawn Vaughn, RB, Vanderbilt 
Jacobs Blocking Trophy: Jonah Allen, OL, Alabama
Scholar-Athlete Player of the Year: Hale Hentges, TE, Alabama

Reference:

All conference teams

Coaches

Media

All-Americans

All-Academic

National award winners

Home game attendance

Game played at Arkansas' secondary home stadium War Memorial Stadium, capacity: 54,120.

Reference:

References